The Scarlet Pimpernel is a series of television drama programmes loosely based on Baroness Emmuska Orczy's series of novels, set during the French Revolution.

It stars Richard E. Grant as Sir Percy Blakeney, and his alter ego, the eponymous hero.  The first series also starred Elizabeth McGovern as his wife Marguerite and Martin Shaw as the Pimpernel's archrival, Paul Chauvelin. Robespierre was played by Ronan Vibert.

It was filmed in the Czech Republic and scored by a Czech composer, Michal Pavlíček.

Cast 
 Stuart Fox as Monsieur Jouvin
 Sarah Berger as Madame Jouvin
 Dalibor Sipek as The Dauphin
 Suzanne Bertish as La Touraine
 Jonathan Coy as Prince of Wales
 Richard E Grant as Sir Percy Blakeney
 Elizabeth McGovern as Lady Marguerite Blakeney
 Anthony Green as Sir Andrew Foulkes
 Beth Goddard as Lady Suzanne Foulkes
 Jerome Willis as Baron Valdemar
 Martin Shaw as Chauvelin
 Ron Donachie as Mazarini
 Gerard Murphy as Planchet
 Ronan Vibert as Robespierre
 Karel Roden as Figaro
 Bryce Engstrom as Gaston
 Christopher Fairbank as Fumier

Episodes

Series 1

Series 2

Awards 
Caroline Carver won a Royal Television Society Best Actress Award for her performance as Claudette in "A Good Name".

External links 
 
 

1999 British television series debuts
2000 British television series endings
1990s British drama television series
2000s British drama television series
Television series set in the French Revolution
Cultural depictions of George IV
Cultural depictions of Maximilien Robespierre
Television shows based on British novels
BBC television dramas
Scarlet Pimpernel films
BBC Birmingham productions
English-language television shows
Films based on works by Emma Orczy